Cédric Doumbé (born August 30, 1992) is a Cameroonian-born French professional mixed martial artist and former kickboxer, currently fighting in the Welterweight division.

In kickboxing, he is a former two-time Glory Welterweight Champion. Doumbé was ranked as the #1 welterweight in the world for several years by Combat Press and other publications. In 2016 he was named the Fighter of the Year by Combat Press and Liver Kick.

Kickboxing career

Early career
Between 2015 and 2016, Cedric Doumbe went to Amsterdam every month to train at Mejiro Gym where he completed his style originally coming from full-contact with strong lowkicks that Mejiro Gym was famous for with fighters such as Rob Kaman. During his time at Mejiro Gym, Cedric trained with Roel Mannaart. He also had several fights, including in Glory, with Mejiro Gym sensei Andre Mannaart in his corner.

In 2015 Doumbe participated in the A1 World Grand Prix, at 75 kg. In the semi finals he fought Djibril Ehouo, and won by a first-round KO. In the finals, he faced Vedat Hoduk. He won a unanimous decision, after an extra round.

In 2016, he once participated in the A1 WGP tournament, at 75 kg. In the semi finals he won a unanimous decision against Ben Hodge. In the finals, he fought a rematch against Djibril Ehouo. He once again won by knockout.

During the Monte Carlo Fighting Masters Series, he fought Ljubo Jalovi for the WAKO Pro K1 World Middleweight title. Doumbe won the fight by a unanimous decision.

Doumbe once again entered the A1 WGP Final Tournament. In the semi finals he won a unanimous decision against Said Zahdi. In the finals, he fought a rematch against Vedat Hoduk. This time the fight didn't go to decision, as Doumbe won the fight by a third-round knockout.

Glory
Doumbé had his first fight with Glory in 2015, during Glory 22: Lille, when he was scheduled to fight Yoann Kongolo as a short notice replacement for Karim Ghajji. Kongolo won a unanimous decision. Doumbé's second fight with Glory was more successful, as he achieved a unanimous decision win over Murthel Groenhart.

In December 2016, he faced Nieky Holzken for the Glory Welterweight title. Doumbe went into the fight as an underdog. He won the fight by a split decision, and became the first French champion in Glory history.

Doumbé made the first successful defense of his Glory welterweight title at Glory 39 on March 25, 2017 in Brussels, Belgium. He defeated Yoann Kongolo by unanimous decision.

He made his second title defense against Nieky Holzken during Glory 42: Paris. Doumbé entered the fight as a favorite to defend the title and successfully defended the title by a split decision.

His third title defense came during Glory 44: Chicago. Doumbé suffered a split decision loss to Murthel Groenhart.

After suffering the loss to Groenhart, Doumbé went on a 4–1 run. During this, he defeated Yohan Lidon, Thongchai Sitsongpeenong, Alan Scheinson, and Jimmy Vienot, with his lone loss during this run being a split decision loss to Alim Nabiev.

This run earned him a chance to fight for the Welterweight title, held at the time by Harut Grigorian. Doumbé won the fight by TKO, after knocking Grigorian down three times in the second round.

His first title defense of the second reign was a rematch against Alim Nabiev. Doumbé won the fight by a right cross knockout in the second round.

Doumbé was scheduled to fight Murthel Groenhart for the third time during Glory 70: Lyon. Doumbé was forced to withdraw from the fight, as he suffered an elbow injury. The trilogy was rescheduled for Glory 76, but the event was later cancelled due to the COVID-19 pandemic. The fight has been scheduled for a third time, for the Glory 76 event on November 7, 2020. The fight fell through once more, as main event fighter Badr Hari contracted COVID-19 and due to a partial lockdown imposed by the Dutch government. The fight was rescheduled for December 19. Groenhart was forced to withdraw from the fight, due to an injury, and was replaced by Karim Ghajji. He won the fight by a third round TKO.

The trilogy bout with Murthel Groenhart was rescheduled for Glory 77. He won the fight by a second-round knockout, stopping Groenhart by an overhand right.

Doumbé announced his retirement from kickboxing at an Empire Fight event in France on October 3, 2021, and announced his switch to MMA. Glory officially declared the welterweight title vacant on November 16, 2021.

Mixed martial arts career

Superkombat Fighting Championship
In October 2021, Eduard Irimia announced that Superkombat Fighting Championship signed Doumbé to a contract. He would make his promotional debut at Superkombat Universe on November 1, 2021, against Arbi Emiev in the main event. Doumbé won the fight by a first-round technical knockout.

Doumbé was expected to face Patrick Spirk at MMAGP on July 9, 2022. Spirk withdrew for undisclosed reasons on July 5 and was replaced by Idriss M'roivili. M'roivili himself withdrew from the bout on July 7, after testing positive for COVID-19, and was replaced by Chai Title. He won the fight by a second-round technical knockout.

Ultimate Fighting Championship
Doumbé was scheduled to face Darian Weeks at UFC Fight Night 209 on September 3, 2022. However the fight was cancelled after the French MMA Federation (FMMAF) would not sanction the bout per the commissions rules that fighters with less than ten professional bouts must not have more than a four fight differential between them.

Doumbé returned to the French regionals, facing Florent Burillon on December 17, 2022 at MMA GP Bordeaux, knocking out his opponent at the end of the first round.

Doumbé faced Paweł Klimas on March 4, 2023 at MMA GP: Paris, winning the bout via TKO stoppage in the second round.

Championships and accomplishments

Kickboxing
Glory
Glory Kickboxing Welterweight Champion (Two times)
Five title defenses  
A1 World Combat Cup
2014 Fight was for A1 Grand Prix Tournament Finalist (75 kg)
2015 A1 World Grand Prix K-1 rules –75 kg 4 Man Tournament Winner
2016 A1 WGP Part 1 Tournament Champion –75.0 kg.
2016 A1 WGP Final Tournament Champion –75.0 kg.
World Association of Kickboxing Organizations
WAKO Pro World K-1 Rules Middleweight Champion –75.0 kg.
Partouche Kickboxing Tour
2015 Partouche Kickboxing Tour - Etape 2 Winner (–75 kg)
World Kickboxing Association
World Kickboxing Association European Champion
World Kickboxing Association World Champion

Awards
Combat Press
2016 Combat Press Fighter of the Year
LiverKick.com
2016 LiverKick Fighter of the Year

Mixed martial arts record

|-
|Win
|align=center|4–0
|Paweł Klimas
|TKO (punches)
|MMA Grand Prix: Paris
|
|align=center|2
|align=center|2:56
|Paris, France
|
|-
|Win
|align=center|3–0
|Florent Burillon
|KO (punches)
|MMA Grand Prix: Bordeaux
|
|align=center|1
|align=center|4:27
|Bordeaux, France
|
|-
|Win
|align=center|2–0
|Phruethukorn Chaichongcharden
|TKO (doctor stoppage)
|MMA Grand Prix: Fight of Fame
|
|align=center|2
|align=center|5:00
|Paris, France
|
|-
|Win
|align=center|1–0
|Arbi Emiev 
|TKO (punches)
|Superkombat Universe
|
|align=center|1
|align=center|4:40
|Dubai, United Arab Emirates
|

Kickboxing record

|-  style="background:#cfc;”
| 2021-01-30 || Win ||align=left| Murthel Groenhart || Glory 77: Rotterdam || Rotterdam, Netherlands || KO (Right cross) || 2 || 2:52
|-
! style=background:white colspan=9 |
|-
|-  style="background:#cfc;"
| 2020-12-19 || Win ||align=left| Karim Ghajji || Glory 76: Rotterdam || Rotterdam, Netherlands || TKO (Punches)  || 3 || 1:49
|-
! style=background:white colspan=9 |
|-
|-  style="background:#cfc;"
| 2019-06-22 || Win ||align=left| Alim Nabiev || Glory 66: Paris || Paris, France || KO (Punches)  || 2 || 2:48
|-
! style=background:white colspan=9 |
|-
|-  style="background:#cfc;"
| 2019-03-09 || Win||align=left| Harut Grigorian || Glory 64: Strasbourg  || Strasbourg, France || TKO (3 Knockdowns Rule) || 2 ||  2:59
|-
! style=background:white colspan=9 |
|-  style="background:#cfc;"
| 2018-10-20 || Win||align=left| Jimmy Vienot|| Glory 60: Lyon  || Lyon, France || Decision (Unanimous) || 3 ||  3:00
|-  style="background:#cfc;"
| 2018-07-20 || Win||align=left| Alan Scheinson|| Glory 55: New York  || New York || TKO (Referee stoppage) || 2 ||  1:38
|-  style="background:#cfc;"
| 2018-05-12 || Win||align=left| Thongchai Sitsongpeenong || Glory 53: Lille  || Lille, France || KO (Right cross) || 1 ||  0:33
|-  style="background:#Fbb;"
| 2018-03-03 || Loss  ||align=left| Alim Nabiev || Glory 51: Rotterdam || Rotterdam, Netherlands || Decision (Split)  || 3  || 3:00
|-
|-  style="background:#cfc;"
| 2017-10-28 || Win  ||align=left| Yohan Lidon || Glory 47: Lyon || Lyon, France || Decision (Unanimous)  || 3  || 3:00
|-
|-  style="background:#Fbb;"
| 2017-08-26 || Loss ||align=left| Murthel Groenhart || Glory 44: Chicago || Hoffman Estates, Illinois, USA || Decision (Split) || 5 || 3:00
|-
! style=background:white colspan=9 |
|-
|-  style="background:#cfc;"
| 2017-06-10 || Win  ||align=left| Nieky Holzken || Glory 42: Paris || Paris, France || Decision (Split)  || 5  || 3:00
|-
! style=background:white colspan=9 |
|-
|-  style="background:#cfc;"
| 2017-03-25 || Win ||align=left| Yoann Kongolo || Glory 39: Brussels || Brussels, Belgium || Decision (Unanimous)  || 5  || 3:00
|-
! style=background:white colspan=9 |
|-
|-  style="background:#cfc;"
| 2016-12-10 || Win  ||align=left| Nieky Holzken || Glory: Collision || Oberhausen, Germany || Decision (Split)  || 5  || 3:00
|-
! style=background:white colspan=9 |
|-
|-  style="background:#cfc;"
| 2016-10-13|| Win ||align=left| Vedat Hoduk || Partouche Kickboxing Tour 2016 - Final || France || KO || 3 ||
|-
! style=background:white colspan=9 |
|-
|-  style="background:#cfc;"
| 2016-10-13|| Win ||align=left| Said Zahdi || Partouche Kickboxing Tour 2016 - Final || France || Decision || 3  || 3:00
|-
|-  style="background:#cfc;"
| 2016-08-06 || Win ||align=left| Chen Yawei || Glory of Heroes 4 || Changzhi, China || KO (Right hook)|| 1 || 3:00
|-  style="background:#cfc;"
| 2016-06-24 || Win ||align=left| Ljubo Jalovi ||  Monte Carlo Fighting Masters series|| Morocco ||Decision|| 5 || 3:00
|-
! style=background:white colspan=9 |
|-
|-  style="background:#cfc;"
| 2016-05-27 || Win ||align=left| Maseh Nuristani || Prize Fighter || Australia || KO || 1 || 3:00
|-  style="background:#cfc;"
| 2016-05-07 || Win ||align=left| Brad Riddell || Glory of Heroes 2 || Shenzhen, China || Decision (Split) || 3 || 3:00
|-  style="background:#cfc;"
| 2016-04-09 || Win ||align=left| Djibril Ehouo || Partouche Kickboxing Final || France || KO || 2 || 3:00
|-
! style=background:white colspan=9 |
|-  style="background:#cfc;"
| 2016-04-09 || Win ||align=left| Ben Hodge  || Partouche Kickboxing Semi Finals || France || Decision  || 3 || 3:00
|-  style="background:#cfc;"
| 2016-03-12 || Win ||align=left| Murthel Groenhart || Glory 28: Paris || Paris, France || Decision (Unanimous) || 3 || 3:00
|-  style="background:#Fbb;"
| 2016-01-23|| Loss ||align=left| Fang Bian || Wu Lin Feng 2016: World Kickboxing Championship in Shanghai || Shanghai, China || Ext. Round Decision (Split) || 4 || 3:00
|-  style="background:#cfc;"
| 2016-01-16 || Win ||align=left| Mamba Cauwenbergh  || Full Contact: Challenge TTT || France || KO  || 2 || 3:00
|-  style="background:#cfc;"
| 2015-11-14 || Win ||align=left| Mohamed Mafoud || La Nuit des Champions 2015 || Marseille, France || KO  || 3 || 3:00
|-  style="background:#cfc;"
| 2015-10-31 || Win ||align=left| Ricardo Cabral || Knock Out Championship || France || Decision (Unanimous)|| 3 || 3:00
|-  style="background:#cfc;"
| 2015-10-15 || Win ||align=left| Vedat Hoduk || A1 World Grand Prix K-1 rules -75 kg Final|| France || Ext. R Decision (Unanimous)|| 4 || 3:00
|-
! style=background:white colspan=9 |
|-  style="background:#cfc;"
| 2015-10-15 || Win ||align=left| Djibril Ehouo  || A1 World Grand Prix K-1 rules -75 kg Semi Finals || France || KO || 1 || 3:00
|-  style="background:#Fbb;"
| 2015-06-05 || Loss ||align=left| Yoann Kongolo || Glory 22: Lille || Lille, France || Decision (Unanimous) || 3 || 3:00
|-  style="background:#cfc;"
| 2015-05-22 || Win ||align=left|Bakari Tounkara|| Partouche Kickboxing Tour - Etape 2 Final || France || KO || 1 || 3:00
|-
! style=background:white colspan=9 |
|-  style="background:#cfc;"
| 2015-05-22 || Win ||align=left| Jimmy Iftene  || Partouche Kickboxing Tour - Etape 2 Semi Finals || France || KO|| 1 || 3:00
|-  style="background:#Fbb;"
|2014-10-23 || Loss ||align=left| Yohan Lidon || A1 Grand Prix Tournament, Final || Lyon, France || Decision || 3 || 3:00
|-
! style=background:white colspan=9 |
|-  style="background:#cfc;"
| 2014-10-23 || Win||align=left| Yuri Bessmertny || A1 WCC Lyon, Semi Final  || Lyon, France || TKO (Cut) || 3 || 3:00
|-  style="background:#Fbb;"
| 2014-09-27 || Loss ||align=left| Yoann Kongolo || Jurafight || Delémont, Switzerland || Decision (Unanimous) || 5 ||3:00
|-  style="background:#c5d2ea"
| 2016-06-05 || Draw ||align=left| Vedat Hoduk || Mionnay|| France ||Decision|| 3 || 3:00
|-  style="background:#Fbb;"
| 2014-05-04 || Loss ||align=left| Raphael Mebenga|| WICKED ONE Tournament 5 Semi Final 80-kg|| Paris, France || Decision (Unanimous) || 3 ||3:00
|-  style="background:#cfc;"
| 2014-05-04 || Win||align=left| Yacine Haddad|| WICKED ONE Tournament 5 Quarter Final 80-kg|| Paris, France || TKO (Referee Stoppage) || 1 ||3:00
|-  style="background:#cfc;"
| 2014-04-26 || Win||align=left| Kamel Mezatni|| Tournoi du Dragon 8|| France || KO || 1 ||3:00
|-  style="background:#cfc;"
| 2014-03-01 || Win||align=left| Tomas Gut|| Nitrianska noc bojovníkov 2014|| Slovakia || KO || 2 ||3:00
|-
! style=background:white colspan=9 |
|-  style="background:#cfc;"
| 2013-12-14 || Win||align=left| Patrick Madisse|| Les Guerriers du Ring|| France || Decision (Split)|| 3 ||3:00
|-  style="background:#cfc;"
| 2013-05-25|| Win||align=left| Josh Granet ||Boxing Factory Trophy 2013|| France || KO || 3 ||3:00
|-
|-
| colspan=9 | Legend:

Television

See also
List of male kickboxers

External links
 Cédric Doumbé at Glory Kickboxing
 Cédric Doumbé at Muaythai TV

References

Living people
1992 births
Light heavyweight kickboxers
Cameroonian male kickboxers
French male kickboxers
Participants in French reality television series 
Cameroonian male mixed martial artists
French male mixed martial artists
Mixed martial artists utilizing kickboxing
Glory kickboxers
SUPERKOMBAT mixed martial artists